Saint John IV (died 17 December 849), called the Peacemaker and known in Italian as Giovanni d'Acquarola or Giovanni Scriba, was the Bishop of Naples from 26 February 842 until his death. He is one of the patron saints of Naples and his feast day is 22 June. He had the relics of Aspren translated to the church of Santa Restituta in Naples. He also assisted Duke Andrew II in negotiating the Pactum Sicardi, an economic treaty, with Sicard, Prince of Benevento.

References

849 deaths
Italian saints
Bishops of Naples
9th-century Italian bishops
9th-century Christian saints
Year of birth unknown